"Indecision" is the first single from Steven Page's solo album, Page One. The song was written by Steven Page with Stephen Duffy. It was released to US and Canadian iTunes, as well as Page's official site for download on 27 July 2010.

Music video
The music video for "Indecision" debuted on 9 October 2010.

References

2010 singles
2010 songs
Songs written by Steven Page
Songs written by Stephen Duffy
Canadian pop rock songs